After You may refer to:

Songs
"After You" (Dionne Warwick song), 1979
"After You" (Dan Seals song), 1983
"After You" (Beverley Knight song), 2007
"After You" (Pulp song), 2013
"After You, Who?", a 1932 song by Cole Porter
"After You", a 1937 song by Frances Faye
"After You", a song by Diana Ross from her 1976 album Diana Ross
"After You", a song by Meghan Trainor from her 2019 EP The Love Train and 2020 studio album Treat Myself

Other uses
After You..., originally Après vous..., a 2003 French film
After You (novel), a 2015 novel by Jojo Moyes
After You (album), a 2019 album by Jack Peñate
After You, a 2010 novel by Julie Buxbaum